James Crosbie may refer to:

 James Crosbie (senator), Irish barrister, journalist and Fine Gael politician, senator 1938–51 and 1954–57
 James Crosbie (Kerry politician) (c1760–1836), MP for County Kerry 1798–1806, 1812–26

See also 
 Crosbie (disambiguation)